Rostamabad (also Romanized as Rostamābād and Rustamābād; formerly, Galūraz, Kalooraz, Kalūraz, and Kuluruz), is a city in the Central District of Rudbar County, in Gilan Province, northern Iran.

It is located on the Sefīd-Rūd river in the Alborz (Elburz) mountain range.

At the 2006 census, its population was 11,987, in 3,234 families.

Climate
Rostamabad has a humid subtropical climate (Köppen: Cfa, Trewartha: Cf), with warm, humid summers and cool, wet winters.

References

Cities in Gilan Province
Populated places in Rudbar County
Settled areas of Elburz